The Chennai Egmore–Puducherry  Auroville Express is an Express train belonging to Southern Railway zone that runs between  and  in India via . It is currently being operated with 16115/16116 train numbers on a daily basis.

Service

The 16115/Chennai Egmore–Puducherry Auroville Express has an average speed of 46 km/hr and covers 196 km in 4h 15m. The 16116/Puducherry–Chennai Egmore Auroville Express has an average speed of 50 km/hr and covers 196 km in 3h 55m.

Coach composition

The train consists of 11 coaches:

 1 Second Sitting
 8 General Unreserved
 2 Seating cum Luggage Rake

Traction

Both trains are hauled by an Arakkonam Loco Shed-based WAM-4 electric locomotive from Chennai to Puducherry and vice versa.

See also 

 Chennai Egmore railway station
 Puducherry railway station

Notes

References

External links 

 16115/Chennai Egmore–Puducherry Express India Rail Info
 16116/Puducherry–Chennai Egmore Express India Rail Info

Express trains in India
Rail transport in Tamil Nadu
Rail transport in Puducherry
Railway services introduced in 2010